Qorveh-e Dargazin is a city and capital of Dargazin County in Hamadan Province, Iran. At the 2006 census, its population was 9,335, in 2,456 families. Area is inhabited with Shia Qaragozlu tribe.

References

Cities in Hamadan Province